The 2008 Basildon District Council election took place on 1 May 2008 to elect members of Basildon District Council in Essex, England. One third of the council was up for election and the Conservative party stayed in overall control of the council.

After the election, the composition of the council was
Conservative 29
Labour 10
Liberal Democrats 3

Candidates
The Conservative, Labour and British National parties stood in all 14 seats contested, which was an increase from 11 at the 2007 election for the British National party. The Liberal Democrats stood in 13 wards, just not contesting Pitsea North West, while there were 4 United Kingdom Independence Party, 3 Green and 3 independent candidates. The independent candidates included councillor Jane Dyer in Vange, after she left the Labour party just before the election, and former councillor David Harrison in Wickford North.

Election result
The results saw the Conservatives increase their majority by 1 after taking Vange ward to hold 29 seats. Conservative Luke Mackenzie became the youngest councillor in Basildon at the age of 22, after taking Vange from independent, formerly Labour, councillor Jane Dyer, who only received 72 votes in the election. Labour remained on 10 seats, with the party 82 votes behind the Conservatives in the contest in Vange. Meanwhile, the Liberal Democrats remained on 3 seats, but finished behind the British National Party in the share of the vote. Overall turnout in the election was 29%.

Following the election Lynda Gordon became the first female group leader on Basildon council, after taking over from Nigel Smith as leader of the Labour group. Smith had declared that he would step down as leader of the Labour group before the election.

All comparisons in vote share are to the corresponding 2004 election.

Ward results

Billericay East

Billericay West

Burstead

Crouch

Fryerns

Laindon Park

Langdon Hills

Lee Chapel North

Nethermayne

Pitsea North West

Pitsea South East

St Martin's

Vange

Wickford North

References

2008
2008 English local elections
2000s in Essex